The Mirage 275 is a Canadian sailboat, that was designed by Philippe Harlé and first built in 1986.

Production
The boat was built by Mirage Yachts in Canada, starting in 1986, but the company went out of business in 1989 and it is now out of production.

Design
The Mirage 275 is a small recreational keelboat, built predominantly of fiberglass. It has a masthead sloop rig, an internally-mounted spade-type rudder and a fixed fin keel. It displaces  and carries  of ballast.

An optional shoal draft wing keel version was also available.

The boat is fitted with a Universal diesel engine.

The wing keel version of the boat has a PHRF racing average handicap of 192 with a high of 186 and low of 201.

See also
List of sailing boat types

Similar sailboats
Cal 27
Cal 2-27
Cal 3-27
C&C 27
Catalina 270
Crown 28
CS 27
Hotfoot 27
Hullmaster 27
Hunter 27
Hunter 27-2
Hunter 27-3
Mirage 27 (Perry)
Mirage 27 (Schmidt)
Orion 27-2

References

Keelboats
1980s sailboat type designs
Sailing yachts
Sailboat type designs by Philippe Harlé
Sailboat types built by Mirage Yachts